Meadowbrook Country Club is a historic country club and national historic district located near Garner, Wake County, North Carolina.  The club was founded in 1959, with initial improvements made throughout the 1960s.  The contributing resources are the lake (1961); pier (1961); picnic area (1962); driving range (1966); nine-hole golf course designed by Gene Hamm (1966); one-story, concrete block, Modern Movement style clubhouse (1962, 1970, 1971); and 18-hole putt-putt course (1962). Meadowbrook Country Club was founded as a private country club for African-Americans.

It was listed on the National Register of Historic Places in 2009.

See also
 Shady Rest Golf and Country Club – established in 1921, listed on the NRHP in Union County, New Jersey
 Clearview Golf Club – listed on the NRHP in Stark County, Ohio

References

African-American history of North Carolina
Historic districts on the National Register of Historic Places in North Carolina
Clubhouses on the National Register of Historic Places in North Carolina
Sports venues completed in 1962
Buildings and structures in Wake County, North Carolina
National Register of Historic Places in Wake County, North Carolina
Golf clubs and courses on the National Register of Historic Places